Nataliya Huba (born 11 March 1978) is a Ukrainian rower. She competed in the women's double sculls event at the 2004 Summer Olympics.

References

External links
 

1978 births
Living people
Ukrainian female rowers
Olympic rowers of Ukraine
Rowers at the 2004 Summer Olympics
Sportspeople from Dnipro